17β-Hydroxysteroid dehydrogenase 1 (17β-HSD1) is an enzyme that in humans is encoded by the HSD17B1 gene. This enzyme oxidizes or reduces the C17 hydroxy/keto group of androgens and estrogens and hence is able to regulate the potency of these sex steroids

Function
This enzyme is responsible for the interconversion of estrone (E1) and estradiol (E2) and for the interconversion of androstenedione and testosterone:

 17β-estradiol + NADP+ +  estrone + NADPH + H+
 testosterone + NADP+ +  androstenedione + NADPH + H+

The human 17β-HSD1 isozyme is highly specific for estrogens over androgens whereas the rodent isozyme is less specific.

Discovery
Human 17β-HSD1 was the first enzyme of the 17β-HSD family to be cloned and to have its sequence identified. Its three-dimensional structure is also the first example of any human steroid-converting enzyme.

Structure
This enzyme contains a short-chain dehydrogenase domain that contains a characteristic 3-layer (αβα) sandwich known as a Rossmann fold. The human enzyme contains 327 amino acids and exists as a homodimer with two identical subunits of 34.5 kDa  The N-terminal short-chain dehydrogenase domain contains binding site for the NADP+/NADPH cofactor. A narrow, hydrophobic C-terminal domain contains a binding pocket for the steroid substrate.

Clinical significance
Estradiol stimulates while dihydrotestosterone (DHT) inhibits breast cancer growth. Furthermore 17β-HSD1 levels positively correlate with estradiol and negatively correlate with DHT levels in breast cancer cells. Hence 17β-HSD1 represents a possible drug target for breast cancer treatment.

See also
 17β-Hydroxysteroid dehydrogenase

Notes

References

Further reading